The Treaty of Kiel or Peace of Kiel (Swedish and  or ) was concluded between the United Kingdom of Great Britain and Ireland and the Kingdom of Sweden on one side and the Kingdoms of Denmark and Norway on the other side on 14 January 1814 in Kiel. It ended the hostilities between the parties in the ongoing Napoleonic Wars, where the United Kingdom and Sweden were part of the anti-French camp (the Sixth Coalition) while Denmark–Norway was allied to France.

Frederick VI of Denmark joined the anti-French alliance, ceded Heligoland to George III of the United Kingdom, and further ceded the Kingdom of Norway to Charles XIII of Sweden in return for Swedish Pomerania. Specifically excluded from the exchange were the Norwegian dependencies of Greenland, Iceland and the Faroe Islands, which remained in the union with Denmark. (Norway would unsuccessfully contest the Danish claim to all of Greenland in the Eastern Greenland Case of 1931–33.)

However, not all provisions of the treaty would come into force. Norway declared its independence, adopted a constitution and elected Crown Prince Christian Frederik as its own king. Sweden therefore refused to hand over Swedish Pomerania, which instead passed to Prussia after the Congress of Vienna in 1815. After a short war with Sweden, Norway accepted entering into a personal union with Sweden at the Convention of Moss. King Christian Frederik abdicated after convening an extraordinary Storting, which revised the Constitution to allow for the Union. It was formally established when the Storting elected Charles XIII as king of Norway on 4 November 1814.

Background

In the beginning of the Napoleonic Wars, Denmark-Norway and the Kingdom of Sweden tried to maintain neutrality but soon became involved in the fighting, joining opposite camps. Swedish king Gustav IV Adolf entered an alliance with the United Kingdom of Great Britain and Ireland and the Russian Empire against Napoleon Bonaparte in 1805, and declared war on Napoleonic France. The United Kingdom, which had declared war on France in 1803, paid subsidies to Sweden. Before Gustav IV Adolf marched his forces out of Swedish Pomerania, a province long coveted by Prussia, he negotiated an agreement that Prussia would not attack it. Denmark remained neutral.

In 1807, Napoleonic forces seized Swedish Pomerania and forced Prussia and Russia to sign the Treaty of Tilsit. Russia was therein obliged to attack Napoleon's enemies, and since Gustav IV Adolf refused to break his alliance with the United Kingdom, the tsar invaded Finland and severed it from Sweden in the Finnish War, 1808/1809. Sweden could no longer uphold her anti-French foreign policy, and French Marshal Jean Baptiste Bernadotte was elected heir to the Swedish throne in 1810. Denmark-Norway entered an alliance with France after the second British bombardment of Copenhagen in 1807.

In 1812, Napoleon's forces were decimated in their failed attempt to subdue Russia, and started their westward retreat. Sweden allied with Russia on 30 August 1812, with the United Kingdom on 3 March 1813, and with Prussia on 22 April 1813. Previously, on 23 March 1813, she had declared war on Napoleon. Bernadotte's condition for entering the anti-Napoleonic alliance was the gain of Norway, which the United Kingdom and Russia accepted in May 1813. Prussia however did not acknowledge this claim at first. Thus, Bernadotte hesitated to enter the war with full force, and only engaged in a campaign against Hamburg which on 30 June was re-conquered by allied French and Danish forces. When Prussia finally accepted the Swedish claim to Norway on 22 July, Sweden joined the alliance of Reichenbach concluded between Russia, the United Kingdom and Prussia on 14/15 June. With three armies (North, Main and Silesian, the Northern army under Bernadotte's command), the allies subsequently cleared Northern Germany of French forces. Denmark, who had maintained the alliance with Napoleon because of the Swedish claim to Norway, was isolated and, as a consequence of the war, bankrupt. Bernadotte, now free to attack Denmark after Napoleon's defeat at Leipzig in Mid-October, took his combined Swedish/Russian Army and quickly defeated the outnumbered Danish Army and occupied Holstein and Schleswig during late December 1813. Frederick VI agreed to make peace once it was clear that Bernadotte would occupy Jutland and Zealand (with British naval assistance), if necessary to force the Norwegian cession.

Dano-British treaty

The treaty between the Kingdom of Denmark and the United Kingdom of Great Britain and Ireland was negotiated by Danish diplomat Edmund Bourke and the British envoy at the Swedish court, Edward Thornton. It consisted of 14 articles, to which two articles were added in Brussels on 7 April.

In article III, the United Kingdom was obliged to return all occupied Danish possessions to the Danish king. Excepted was the island of Heligoland, where the British king was granted "full and unlimited sovereignty".

In article VI, the Danish king joined the anti-Napoleonic alliance, and obliged himself to maintain an army of 10,000 men that was to be joined to the Allied forces in Northern Germany and likewise be commanded by the Swedish crown prince. This Danish contingent was to be treated the same way the Swedish contingent was treated, and the Danish king was to receive an annual 400,000 pounds of British subsidies for maintenance and pay of the army, to be paid in monthly installments as soon as the army entered Allied service.

Article VIII was concerned with the abolishment of slave trade. In article X, the British king promised the Danish king to negotiate further compensation for Denmark's territorial cessions to Sweden in a pending final peace. In article XIII, older Dano-British treaties were confirmed.

The articles added in Brussels were concerned with the property of Danish subjects in the colonies or in ceded territories, which was to remain untouched by the British for the next three years, and equal treatment of Danish, British and Hanoveranian subjects, who were not to be prosecuted because of their participation in the war on different sides, nor because of their political or religious beliefs.

Dano-Swedish treaty

The treaty between the Kingdom of Denmark and the Kingdom of Sweden was negotiated by Danish diplomat Edmund Bourke (Burke) and Swedish envoy Baron Gustaf af Wetterstedt with British mediation. It consisted of 28 articles and one separate article. In article III, the Danish king promised to join the alliance against Napoleonic France, and with reference to the Dano-British treaty confirms his obligation to put part of his army under Swedish command.

In article IV, the Danish king in his and his successors' name "irrevocably and forever" renounced claims to the Kingdom of Norway in favor of the Swedish king. The Norwegian kingdom was defined as consisting of the bishoprics of Christiansand, Bergen, Akershus and Trondheim, as well as the coastal islands and the northern regions of Nordland and Finnmark to the Russian border. Excepted were Greenland, Iceland and the Faroe Islands. The Norwegian subjects were freed of their obligations to the Danish king. In article VI, the Swedish crown took over the debts and financial obligations of Norway, which was to be determined by a joint Dano-Swedish commission.

Article VII ruled that Swedish Pomerania was to be handed over to Denmark. In article XV, it was ruled that the Swedish forces were to take over the Norwegian fortresses as soon as the treaty was ratified, and that they were to abandon Swedish Pomerania as soon as the Norwegian fortresses Fredriksten, Fredrikstad, Kongsvinger and Akershus were handed over. In article XIII, the Swedish king promised the Danish king to negotiate full compensation for the cession of Norway in a pending final peace, and the cession of Swedish Pomerania is described as a "proof" of this intention.

In article XII, the king of Sweden promised to maintain the Norwegian University of Christiania, and the Pomeranian University of Greifswald, which was to pass to Denmark according to article VII, and confirmed donations made before the exchange. Also, it was agreed in article XX that subjects of the Danish king could choose within the next six years whether they would finally settle in Norway or Denmark, whereby property in the realm which would not become the permanent residence was to be sold only to inhabitants of this realm. This provision was also enacted with respect to Swedish Pomerania. In article XVI, it was agreed that the governors general and all foreign-born officials of the exchanged territories, as long as they did not decide to remain, were removed from their offices. Article XXI obliged the Danish administration to hand over all civilian and military administrative documents and archives concerning Norway.

Article XVII provided for a mutual exchange of all prisoners of war. According to article XV, allied troops were to leave the Danish Duchy of Schleswig (Slesvig), but were allowed to remain in the German confederal Duchy of Holstein (Holsten), ruled in personal union with Denmark and Schleswig, to participate in the encirclement of Hamburg. In article XXVII, former Dano-Swedish peaces were confirmed as long as their provisions were not in conflict with the treaty of Kiel, namely the Treaty of Copenhagen (1660), the Treaty of Stockholm (June 1720), the Treaty of Frederiksborg (July 1720) and the Treaty of Jönköping (1809). A separate article was concerned with the cession of hostilities.

Impact

The personal union of Sweden and Norway

On hearing news of the treaty, which became known through proclamation at the end of January, and published in Norwegian newspapers soon after, Norwegians were in dismay, and many called for arms, having beaten the Swedes only five years prior. A virtual independence movement had been established as early as 1810, and this movement gained momentum in the brooding situation. The Crown Prince of Denmark and Norway, Christian Frederick, the resident viceroy in Norway, used this opportunity to intervene. He took the helm in the Norwegian independence movement, most likely with the surreptitious goal of re-unification with Denmark. This was not in the interest of all Norwegians. In fact, the founders of the 1810 movement lobbied for an independent Norway. The initiative of Christian Frederick was successful, partly due to clandestine support from the Danish Crown, but also because it was supported by prominent and influential Norwegians. They convinced the Prince that it would be unwise to claim the throne as his inheritance. Instead they advised him to assume the regency and call an election of representatives to a constituent assembly.

On 10 April the national assembly met at Eidsvoll to decide on a Constitution. Norway eventually declared independence on 17 May 1814, electing Christian Frederick as King. This triggered a short war with Sweden in which Sweden's military, fresh from the campaign against Napoleon, proved too much to overcome. Nevertheless, when cease-fire talks began, Bernadotte made an important concession—he accepted the newly adopted Norwegian constitution, thus giving up any claim that Norway was to be treated as merely a Swedish province. In accordance with the Convention of Moss, Norway agreed to enter a personal union with Sweden. After having made the necessary amendments to the constitution, the Norwegian Storting on 4 November elected Charles XIII of Sweden as King of Norway, creating the union between Sweden and Norway.

Swedish Pomerania

Due to the refusal of Norway to subordinate itself to the Swedish king, Charles XIII of Sweden did not hand over Swedish Pomerania to Frederick VI of Denmark. The problem was solved at the Congress of Vienna, when the Great Powers followed a plan worked out by Karl August von Hardenberg, prime minister of the Kingdom of Prussia, who proposed a ring exchange of territories and payments between the Kingdom of Denmark, the Kingdom of Hanover (ruled in personal union with Great Britain and Ireland), the Kingdom of Prussia and the Kingdom of Sweden.

According to Hardenberg's plan, Prussia ceded East Frisia with Emden to Hanover, and in exchange received from Hanover the Duchy of Lauenburg. This duchy was then handed over from Prussia to Denmark, along with an additional payment of 3.5 million talers. Prussia also took over a Danish debt to Sweden of 600,000 talers, and agreed on an additional payment of 2 million talers to Sweden. Denmark and Sweden in turn relinquished their claims to Swedish Pomerania in favour of Prussia. Charles XIII of Sweden then released his Pomeranian subjects from their obligations towards Sweden on 1 October 1815, and on 23 October the province was handed over to von Ingersleben, president of Prussian Pomerania.

East Greenland case

Between 1931 and 1933, Norway contested the Danish possession of all of Greenland at the Permanent Court of International Justice in The Hague. , this was the only case where possession of a polar territory was ever decided by an international court.

The Norwegian side argued that Denmark did not hold rights to any part of the island where she did not exact actual sovereignty, and accordingly proclaimed a Norwegian Eirik Raudes Land in eastern Greenland on 10 July 1931, which had been occupied in the previous month. On 5 April 1933 however, the court ruled that on the basis of the Treaty of Kiel and subsequent treaties, Denmark was the sovereign over the whole of Greenland.

See also
History of Denmark
History of Norway
Scandinavia
Norway in 1814

References

Bibliography

External links

Kiel
Kiel
Kiel
Kiel
Kiel
Kiel
Kiel
Kiel
1814 in Denmark
Kiel
1814 in Sweden
Treaties of the United Kingdom (1801–1922)
1814 in Norway
British Heligoland
January 1814 events